Conquistador is the debut studio album by American musician and lead guitarist of Earth, Dylan Carlson. It was released on April 27, 2018 under Sargent House.

Singles
On March 7, 2018, Carlson released the first single from the album, "Scorpions In Their Mouths".

Critical reception
Conquistador was met with "generally favorable" reviews from critics. At Metacritic, which assigns a weighted average rating out of 100 to reviews from mainstream publications, this release received an average score of 75, based on 8 reviews. Aggregator Album of the Year gave the release a 78 out of 100 based on a critical consensus of 7 reviews.

Track listing

Personnel

Musicians
 Dylan Carlson – lead artist, guitar, producer
 Holly Carlson – percussion
 Emma Ruth Rundle – baritone and slide guitar, devices, and percussion

Production
 Kurt Ballou – engineer, producer
 Carl Saff – mastering

References

2018 albums
Albums produced by Kurt Ballou
Sargent House albums